General elections were held in Anguilla on 21 February 2005 to elect the seven elected seats in the House of Assembly. The Anguilla United Front, an alliance of the Anguilla National Alliance and the Anguilla Democratic Party, won the elections retaining four of the elected seats.

Background
In the previous elections in 2000, the governing Anguilla United Party was defeated by a coalition of the Anguilla National Alliance and the Anguilla Democratic Party. Together the two parties won four of the seven elected seats and the leader of the Anguilla National Alliance, Osbourne Fleming, became Chief Minister. In May 2004 the leadership of the opposition passed from Hubert Hughes, leader of the Anguilla United Movement party, to Edison Baird, leader of the Anguilla Strategic Alliance. This came after one member of the House of Assembly, Albert Hughes, changed parties.

Electoral system
The House of Assembly has 11 members. Seven members are directly elected by the plurality voting system while the other four members are appointed. One of the appointed members is chosen by the governing party, while the other three are appointed by the Governor, with one of the three appointments being made in consultation with the opposition.

Campaign
Towards the end of January 2005 Chief Minister Osbourne Fleming announced that the election would be held on 21 February, with nominations required by the 8 February. A record 25 candidates put themselves up for election by the 7,560 eligible voters.

The governing Anguilla United Front stood based on the development they had brought over the past five years, including the island's first 18 hole golf course, the renovation of Wallblake Airport and plans for a luxury hotel. Osbourne Fleming claimed that the developments would bring jobs and had made Anguilla significantly different from how it had been five years before.

Three opposition parties, the Anguilla Strategic Alliance, Anguilla United Movement and Anguilla Progressive Party  fielded candidates. Opposition leader Edison Baird of the Anguilla Strategic Alliance said that the government had not been open enough in explaining how the development project would benefit ordinary Anguillans. Opposition parties also criticised tax concessions given to the company who would be building the luxury hotel.

Results
All 6 incumbents who sought re-election kept their seats in the election. The only change took place in Valley North where the previous representative, Eric Reid, stood down and was succeeded by Evans McNeil Rogers.

Aftermath
The day after the elections was declared a national holiday and the four elected members of the Anguilla United Front were sworn into government by the Governor Alan Huckle. Following the election, Albert Hughes, left the Anguilla Strategic Alliance and joined the government. This meant the opposition was evenly split between the Anguilla Strategic Alliance and the Anguilla United Movement, so the Governor did not appoint a Leader of the Opposition.

References

External links
District results
Full list of candidates

Elections in Anguilla
Anguilla
General election
Anguilla
February 2005 events in North America